José Navarro y Llorens (1867–1923) was a Spanish painter, active in Valencia noted for his Orientalist paintings, still lifes and local landscapes.

Life and career
 
José Navarro y Llorens was born in Godella, near Valencia, Spain in 1867. He received his art education at the San Carlos Academy in Valencia, a city to which he remained very attached throughout his life.

He lived in Madrid from around 1920. He travelled extensively through Europe and North Africa, to expand his knowledge of the arts. He visited Morocco while relatively young. In Morocco, he developed an affinity for oriental subject matter. Navarro was a great admirer of Mariano Fortuny, which was possibly the inspiration that impelled him to travel to Morocco. He used both oils and water-colours with equal success.

Select list of works
 El Zoco [The Souk or Market at Tangier] 
 Toros [Bulls]
 La Plaza Redonda,  [The Round Square]
 Escena En La Playa, [Beach Scene]
 En El Puerto, [At the Port]
 Playa con Barcas Varadas, [Beach with Abandoned Boats]
 Gitanillos, [Gypsy Children]
 Calle Morocaine, [Moroccan Street], Private collection
 Bab-Ftouh, Fes [Bab-Ftouh, Fez]
 Evocación de Marruecos [Impression of Morocco], Prado, Madrid

Gallery

See also
List of Orientalist artists
Orientalism

References

External links
 Valencia Art exhibit.

People from Valencia
18th-century Spanish painters
18th-century Spanish male artists
Spanish male painters
Spanish floral still life painters
Orientalist painters
Painters from the Valencian Community
1867 births
1923 deaths